Swimming at the 2011 Military World Games was held from 17 – 20 July 2011 at the Maria Lenk Aquatic Center, Rio de Janeiro.

Medal summary

Men

Women

Medal table

References
Swimming results at the 2011 Military World Games website

Military World Games
2011 Military World Games
2011